Hoʻokupu is a Hawaiian language term for gifts and offerings. The ceremony dates back hundreds of years, to a time when the average Hawaiian subsisted on manual labor, with little-to-no financial assets. Their gifts were literally the fruits of their personal labors to the Hawaiian aliʻi (rulers), or to visiting royalty.  Through time, the gifts became more monetary based and a part of the monarch's wealth. Although they were allowed to approach the monarch with the gifts, they were handed to a royal attendant so as not to touch the aliʻi. In 1869, the visiting Duke of Edinburgh Prince Alfred was accorded a hoʻokupu by Kamehameha V, and broke with protocol by reaching out to touch any gift-giver who wished to shake his hand.

The gift protocol is still done for Lono during the Makahiki festival and for celebrations related to Hawaiian kings.

References

Hawaiian words and phrases